Sir John Arthur Stallworthy   (26 July 1906 – 19 November 1993) was a New Zealand-born British obstetrician who was Nuffield Professor of Obstetrics and Gynaecology at the University of Oxford from 1967 to 1973.

Stallworthy was born in Auckland in 1906. His father was Arthur Stallworthy, who later became member of parliament for the  electorate (–1935). His grandfather, John Stallworthy, was member of parliament for the  electorate (–1911). Stallworthy received his education at Auckland Grammar School and won a scholarship to Auckland University College, where he studied law and medicine. He decided to proceed with medicine and went to the University of Otago.

He was knighted in 1972 for services to medicine. He twice served as president of the Royal Society of Medicine, firstly from 1973 to 1975 and secondly from 1980 to 1982.

His son was Jon Stallworthy, biographer, literary critic and Professor of English Literature at Oxford University.

References 

1906 births
1993 deaths
People educated at Auckland Grammar School
University of Otago alumni
New Zealand emigrants to the United Kingdom
20th-century British medical doctors
British obstetricians
Knights Bachelor
Presidents of the Royal Society of Medicine